GCB may refer to:

 Gaming control board
 GCB (TV series), American television series
 GCB (McDonald's), a Malaysian product of McDonald's
 GCB Bank, formerly Ghana Commercial Bank
 Generator circuit breaker
 Gilmore City–Bradgate Community School District
 Giro Commercial Bank, a defunct commercial bank in Kenya
 Global Corruption Barometer
 Gloucestershire Cricket Board, in England
 Glucocerebrosidase, enzyme
 (Dame or Knight) Grand Cross of the Order of the Bath
 Green Camel Bell, Chinese environmental organization
 Groupe Communiste Burkinabè, defunct political party of Burkina Faso
 Guides Catholiques de Belgique, French-speaking Belgian Girl Guiding organization